Used goods mean any item of personal property offered for sale not as new, including metals in any form except coins that are legal tender, but excluding books, magazines, and postage stamps.

Risks
Furniture, in particular bedding or upholstered items, may have bedbugs, if they have not been examined by an expert.

Benefits
Recycling goods through the secondhand market reduces use of resources in manufacturing new goods and diminishes waste which must be disposed of, both of which are significant environmental benefits.Another benefit of recycling clothes is for the creation for new pieces of clothing from combings parts of recycled clothes to make a whole new piece. This has been done by multiple fashion designers recently and has been growing in recent years. 
However, manufacturers who profit from sales of new goods lose corresponding sales. Scientific research shows that buying used goods reduces carbon footprint and  emissions significantly compared to the complete product life cycle, because of less production, raw material sourcing and logistics. Often the relative carbon footprint of production, raw material sourcing and the supply chain is unknown. A scientific methodology has been made to analyze how much CO2 emissions are reduced when buying used goods like secondhand hardware versus new hardware.

Quality secondhand goods can be more durable than equivalent new goods.

Types of transfers
Many items that are considered obsolete and worthless in developed countries, such as decade-old hand tools and clothes, are useful and valuable in impoverished communities in the country or in developing countries. Underdeveloped countries like Zambia are extremely welcoming to donated secondhand clothing. At a time when the country's economy was in severe decline, the used goods provided jobs by keeping "many others busy with repairs and alterations". It has created a type of spin-off economy at a time when many Zambians were out of work. The used garments and materials that were donated to the country also allowed for the production of "a wide range of fabrics" whose imports had been previously restricted. The trade is essentially executed by women who operate their small business based on local associations and networks. Not only does this provide self-employment, but it also increases household income and enhances the economy. But while many countries would be welcoming of secondhand goods, it is also true that there are countries in need who refuse donated items. Countries like Poland, the Philippines, and Pakistan have been known to reject secondhand items for "fear of venereal disease and risk to personal hygiene". Similar to these countries, India also refuses the import of secondhand clothing but will accept the import of wool fibers, including mutilated hosiery which is a term meaning "woollen garments shredded by machine in the West prior to export". Through the production of shoddy (recycled wool), most of which is produced in Northern India today, unused clothing can be recycled into fibers that are spun into yarn for reuse in "new" used goods.

There has been concern that export of electronic waste is disguised as trade of used goods, with the equipment ending in poor-country waste dumps.,

Types

Used clothing 

In developed countries, unwanted used clothing is often donated to charities that sort and sell it. Some of these distribute some of the clothing to people on low incomes for free or at a very low price. Others sell all of the collected clothing in bulk to a commercial used clothing redistributor and then use the raised funds to finance their activities. In the U.S., almost 5 billion pounds of clothing is donated to charity shops each year. Only about 10% of it can be re-sold by the charity shops. About a third of the donated clothing is bought, usually in bulk and at a heavy discount, by commercial dealers and fabric recyclers, who export it to other countries. Some of the used clothes are also smuggled into Mexico.

Whereas charity shops dominated the secondhand market from the 1960s to the 1970s, more specialized, profit-oriented shops emerged in the 1980s. These shops catered primarily to the fashionable female demographic and offered women and children designer clothes, and occasionally high-end formal wear for men. Resale boutiques specialized in contemporary high-end used designer fashion (for example, 2nd Take, or Couture Designer Resale), while others (such as Buffalo Exchange and Plato's Closet) specialize in vintage or retro fashion, period fashion, or contemporary basics and one-of-a-kind finds. Still others cater to specific active sports by specializing in things like riding equipment, diving gear, etc. The resale business model has now expanded into the athletic equipment, books, and music categories. Secondhand sales migrated to a peer-to-peer platform—effectively cutting out the retailer as the middleman—when websites such as eBay and Amazon introduced the opportunity for Internet users to sell virtually anything online, including designer (or fraudulent) handbags, fashion, shoes, and accessories.

Used clothing unsuitable for sale in an affluent market may still find a buyer or end-user in another market, such as a student market or a less affluent region of a developing country. In developing countries, such as Zambia, secondhand clothing is sorted, recycled, and sometimes redistributed to other nations. Some of the scraps are kept and used to create unique fashions that enable the locals to construct identity. Not only does the trade represent a great source of employment for women as well as men, but it also supports other facets of the economy: the merchants buy timber and other materials for their stands, metal hangers to display clothing, and food and drinks for customers. Carriers also find work as they transport the garments from factories to various locations. The secondhand clothing trade is central to the lives of many citizens dwelling in such countries. 
 
Importation of used clothing is sometimes opposed by the textile industry in developing countries. They are concerned that fewer people will buy the new clothes that they make when it is cheaper to buy imported used clothing. Nearly all the clothes made in Mexico are intended for export, and the Mexican textile industry opposes the importation of used clothes.

Electronics and home appliance 
Electronics usually are traded as second hand goods, and may represent a hazard if disposed off incorrectly. Many of them may still be used, despite they are sometimes outdated ( for example TV's. While people may buy a new O-LED, and dispose off an older LCD TV, if still functional, it can be sold, not disposed off). In case of electronics, older electronics ( like home audio equipment) may outlast new equipment. It is the same for some home appliances.

Design and furniture 
Design items and furniture are also seeing an increase in being traded as secondhand goods. With some designer items being sought after in marketplaces. When trading design furniture and items you usually must be aware of the original retail price as most of the goods, if kept well, retain their value quite well.

Other items 
The Sierra Club, an environmental organization, argues that secondhand purchasing of furniture is the "greenest" way of furnishing a home.

See also 

 Atomic Ed and the Black Hole, a documentary film about a unique secondhand shop
 Auto auction
 Car boot sale
 Flea market
 Freeganism
 Regifting
 Recommerce
 Rebag
 Regiving
 Reseller
 Secondary market
 The RealReal
 Fashionphile
 The Market for Lemons, a book discussing a phenomenon that may make it difficult to maintain quality in markets for certain used goods, such as computers and cars

References

Sustainable design
Sustainable business
Repurposing
Retailing by products and services sold
Waste